Vintage NBA is an American basketball biography television series that was aired on ESPN Classic from 1999 to 2002, hosted by Robin Roberts. It is about the entire life of an NBA basketball player, coach or a league.

Segments
Introduction by present NBA players: Introduces the NBA player by representing any memorabilia from an NBA player
The NBA Career: Talking about their life of NBA player
Airwave Archive: Talking about the game they worked as a legend and called it GREATEST with trivia

Broadcasting
In the Philippines, it aired on  Basketball TV.  Prior to being picked up by BTV at the channel's launch in 2006, it was aired on Solar Sports.

Vintage NBA
ESPN Classic original programming
1999 American television series debuts
2002 American television series endings
English-language television shows